Hallingdølen is a Norwegian language local newspaper published in Ål, Norway and serves Hallingdal.

Profile
Hallingdølen was established in 1936. The paper is not owned by one of the large media conglomerates. It was founded by community members. The paper is published three times per week and has its headquarters in Ål. It was published in broadsheet format until 1995 when it switched to tabloid format. Bjarne Tormodsgard is the editor-in-chief of the paper.

In 2013 Hallingdølen was awarded the European Newspaper of the Year in the category of local newspapers.

In 2007 the circulation of Hallingdølen was 10,215 copies.

References

External links
 Official website

1936 establishments in Norway
Mass media in Buskerud
Newspapers published in Norway
Norwegian-language newspapers
Publications established in 1936